Vivian Richards is a former international cricketer and captain of the West Indies cricket team. He has scored centuries (100 runs or more) in both Test and One Day International (ODI) matches. In 2000, he was knighted for his services to cricket, and during the same year named as one of five Wisden Cricketers of the Century. He is generally considered one of the greatest batsmen of all time, and in 2002 he was honoured by Wisden, who named him as the greatest ODI batsman of all time, and the third greatest Test batsman. After four years, he received the Most Exalted Order of National Hero award in his native Antigua.

Richards made his Test debut against India in November 1974, and scored his maiden Test century during the second Test of the same tour, scoring an unbeaten 192 in the first-innings of the match. In 1976, he scored seven Test centuries in a calendar year, passing Garfield Sobers' record of six, which had been set in 1958. He scored his maiden double century in the first Test of that year's tour of England at Trent Bridge, Nottingham making 232. After scoring a century in the third Test, he once again scored a double century in the fifth Test, accumulating his highest score, 291, at The Oval, London. These centuries, and a total of 1,710 Test runs in the year, helped him to be named as one of the five Wisden Cricketers of the Year in 1977. In 1986, facing England at the Antigua Recreation Ground, Richards scored the fastest century in Test cricket, reaching his twentieth Test hundred in 56 balls. Richards has the third-highest number of centuries for the West Indies, behind Brian Lara's 34 and Sobers' 26.

In One Day International cricket, Richards made his debut during the 1975 Cricket World Cup in England. He scored his first century the following year in the same country, during the first ODI match of the tour, remaining 119 not out. He holds the two highest scores by a West Indian batsman in ODI cricket, 181 against Sri Lanka in 1987 and 189 not out against England in 1984. His score of 189 not out was also the highest score by any ODI batsman for just under 13 years, until it was surpassed by Saeed Anwar's 194. This innings was also named by Wisden as the best ODI innings of all-time in a 2002 list. In total, seven of Richards' eleven centuries were in the top 100, and his 1979 unbeaten 138 against England at Lord's ranked second.

Key
 * denotes that he remained not out.
  denotes that he was the captain of the West Indian team in that match.
 Pos. denotes his position in the batting order.
 Test denotes the number of the Test match played in that series.
 Inn. denotes the number of the innings in the match.
 H/A/N denotes whether the venue is home (West Indies), away (opposition's home) or neutral.
 Lost denotes that the match was lost by West Indies.
 Won denotes that the match was won by West Indies.
 BF denotes the number of balls faced by Richards in his innings.
 S/R denotes strike rate.

Test cricket centuries

ODI centuries

Notes

References

External links
 Player Profile: Sir Viv Richards from Cricinfo
 Player Profile: Viv Richards from CricketArchive

Richards
Richards, Viv